The Stone Arch Underpass is a historic stone arch bridge spanning Glen Road in Lebanon, New Hampshire.  Built about 1848, it carried the Boston and Maine Railroad's former Northern Line.  It is one of a small number of 19th-century stone arch bridges in the state, and the only one known in central western New Hampshire.  The bridge was listed on the National Register of Historic Places in 1985.  The railroad right-of-way has been functionally abandoned, and the bridge may become part of a continuation of the Northern Rail Trail.

Description and history
The Stone Arch Underpass is located in western Lebanon, on Glen Road, a rural-industrial route paralleling the Mascoma River, which flows to its south. The river is also roughly paralleled by the former right-of-way of the railroad. The underpass is an architecturally distinctive and unusual construction, oriented in a roughly east–west orientation. Modern metal tie rods have been added to the arch, and the bridge is capped in concrete, which provides the foundation for the rail bed. The arch is narrow enough that there is room for only a single lane of traffic.

The Northern Railroad was incorporated in 1844, and began service in 1848 between Concord, New Hampshire and White River Junction, Vermont.  This underpass was built as part of the construction of that service.  While no detailed records indicate who designed it, it may have been the work of the railroad's chief engineer, H. R. Campbell.

See also

National Register of Historic Places listings in Grafton County, New Hampshire
List of bridges on the National Register of Historic Places in New Hampshire

References

External links

Railroad bridges on the National Register of Historic Places in New Hampshire
Bridges completed in 1848
Bridges in Grafton County, New Hampshire
National Register of Historic Places in Grafton County, New Hampshire
Lebanon, New Hampshire
Stone arch bridges in the United States